Radu Goldiş (born 1947 in Bucharest, Romania) is a Romanian-born American jazz guitarist and composer.

Goldiş is a graduate of the Bucharest Music Conservatory in the musicology department. He was Influenced by Kenny Burrell, Joe Pass, Wes Montgomery, and Rune Gustafsson. He has played with Johnny Răducanu, Eugen Gondi, and Horia Moculescu. He composed music for the Romanian movies Zile fierbinṭi and Accident (both in 1976). With Adrian Enescu he composed music for the Romanian movie Al patrulea stol (1978) and with Petru Mărgineanu he composed the music for the American-Romanian movie Point Zero- Cry of Redemption (1995).

He has worked as an orchestrator for Margareta Pâslaru.

Discography
 Alter Ego (Electrecord, 1980)
 Jazz Restitutio 4 (Spinning Wheel, Electrecord, 1993)
 Romanian Jazz: Jazz from the Electrecord Archives 1966–1978 (Balada, Sonar Kollektiv, 2007
 Unconditional Love

References
Mihai Berindei, Dicționar de jazz, Editura Științifică și enciclopedică, București, 1976, p. 107

1947 births
Living people
American film score composers
American male film score composers
American jazz guitarists
American jazz musicians
Romanian emigrants to the United States
Romanian jazz musicians
20th-century American guitarists
American male guitarists
20th-century American male musicians
American male jazz musicians